Odaipatti is a panchayat town in Theni district in the Tamil Nadu state of India.

Geography
The natural water sources are not potable.

Climate
The temperature is hot during the summer months.

Demographics

Population
As of the 2011 India census, Odaipatti had a population of 13,892.  The sex ratio in 2011 was 49.8% male and 50.2% female, which contrasts with the national average of 943 females per 1000 males according to the same census. Odaipatti has an average literacy rate of 69.8%, which is lower than the national average of 74.04%. Male literacy is 76%, while female literacy is 52%. In Odaipatti, 8.4% of the population are under 7 years of age.

Economy
The major industry sector in this town is the cultivation of grapes, bananas, beans, and coconuts.

Education
The Odaipatti Government Higher Secondary School is the main educational facility in the town. Students received the Runner up prize in Kho kho at South-Zone level in 2007, 2008, 2009, 2010. Odaipatti School alumni who were ex-servicemen conducted the ″Namathu Kiramam Namathu Kalvichalai″. Purified drinking water facilities are available on school premises.

References

Cities and towns in Theni district